Water-shield may refer to following aquatic plants:

 Brasenia schreberi (water-shield)
 Cabomba caroliniana (fanwort; Carolina water-shield)